Gladys Maxine Cooper Gomberg (May 12, 1924 – April 4, 2009) was an American actress, activist, and photographer. She was perhaps best known for her role as private detective Mike Hammer's secretary Velda in the 1955 film Kiss Me Deadly, which the Los Angeles Times called a "film noir classic."

Early life
Gladys Maxine Cooper was born in Chicago, Illinois, in 1924 to Richard and Gladys Cooper. Her father was employed as a General Electric distributor. She first became interested in the theater and acting while she was enrolled as a student at Bennington College in Vermont. Cooper transferred to the Pasadena Playhouse in Pasadena, California, where she completed her education in drama.

Early career 
Cooper travelled to Europe in 1946 to perform for United States military troops stationed on the continent, following the end of World War II as part of the United Services Organization (USO). She travelled throughout post-war Europe, entertaining the troops with an ensemble of other actors, including Veda Ann Borg, Rose Hobart, and Ellen Corby.

She remained in Europe for more than five years, performing in both theatrical productions and television shows for the BBC. Her BBC television play credits included I Killed the Count in 1948, and You Can't Take It with You in 1947, which co-starred Finlay Currie. She often performed at the Café de Paris in London.

Cooper returned to the United States during the 1950s, and appeared in a number of television roles, including the 1959 Twilight Zone episode "And When the Sky Was Opened", and Dragnet. She also made two guest appearances on Perry Mason.: in 1958 she played Gladys Strome, the title character, in "The Case of the Fugitive Nurse," and in 1959 she played Edith Devoe, also a nurse, in "The Case of the Caretaker's Cat."

Kiss Me Deadly
Cooper made her film debut in the 1955 thriller Kiss Me Deadly, which was based on a novel by Mickey Spillane. Director Robert Aldrich cast Cooper in Kiss Me Deadly after seeing her turn as the character Anitra in a Los Angeles production of the play Peer Gynt. Aldrich later cast Cooper in two of his other films, Autumn Leaves (1956) and What Ever Happened to Baby Jane? (1962).

She portrayed the character Velda, a trustworthy secretary to Ralph Meeker's detective Mike Hammer, the film's main character. In the early 1970s, the original ending in which Velda and Mike view an explosion which destroyed the beach house had vanished. The real ending was rediscovered by a film editor in the 1990s, though no one is sure why the ending had been tampered.

Later career
Cooper married Sy Gomberg, a screenwriter and producer, in 1957. She left the acting profession in the early 1960s in order to raise her family.

Gomberg and her husband became active members of the Hollywood activist community. She helped to organize groups of actors, writers and studio executives to participate in marches with Martin Luther King Jr. in Montgomery, Alabama, during the 1960s. Cooper also led campaigns against House Un-American Activities Committee's Hollywood blacklists. She also spearheaded protests by those in the entertainment industry against nuclear weapons, the Vietnam War, and other causes.

Gomberg briefly returned to her acting roots during the 1970s. She made a cameo appearance as herself in the 1975 television series Fear on Trial, which starred George C. Scott as John Henry Faulk, a blacklisted 1950s television and radio host.

Gomberg became a photographer during her later life. Her photographs were used to illustrate a book by Howard Fast entitled The Art of Zen Meditation. The Los Angeles Times referred to the book as "beautiful" in a 1977 book review when referring to her photographs.

Death
Maxine and Sy Gomberg remained married until his death in 2001, aged 82. She died on April 4, 2009 from natural causes at her home in Los Angeles, aged 84.

Filmography

References

External links
 
 
 
 

1924 births
2009 deaths
Actresses from Chicago
American film actresses
American television actresses
American anti–nuclear weapons activists
American anti–Vietnam War activists
American civil rights activists
Women civil rights activists
Burials at Mount Sinai Memorial Park Cemetery
20th-century American actresses
21st-century American women